Løvland's cabinet was the government of Norway between 23 October 1907 and 19 March 1908. The cabinet was led by Prime Minister Jørgen Løvland of the Liberal Party and consisted of nine ministers, mostly from the Liberal Party, one from the Moderate Liberal Party and two independents. During the State Council on 14 March 1908, Prime Minister Løvland asked to resign after cabinet had got a negative majority against it for the debate on the speech of the Throne. The resignation was accepted by King Haakon VII during the State Council on 18 March and took effect the day after at 10:30am. The first cabinet of Gunnar Knudsen was then appointed with immediate effect at the same time stamp.

Cabinet members
The cabinet was intact through Løvland's entire term. Three ministers, Arctander, Aarrestad and Brunchorst, were retained from Michelsen's cabinet.

|}

References

Cabinet of Norway
Cabinets involving the Liberal Party (Norway)
Moderate Liberal Party
1907 establishments in Norway
1908 disestablishments in Norway
Cabinets established in 1907
Cabinets disestablished in 1908